Purcelliana is a  genus of South African long-spinneret ground spiders. It was first described by J. A. L. Cooke in 1964, and is only found in South Africa.

Species
 it contains four species:
 Purcelliana cederbergensis Rodrigues & Rheims, 2020 – South Africa
 Purcelliana kamaseb Rodrigues & Rheims, 2020 – Namibia
 Purcelliana khabus Rodrigues & Rheims, 2020 – Namibia
 Purcelliana problematica Cooke, 1964 – South Africa

See also
 List of Prodidominae species

References

Prodidominae
Spiders of South Africa
Araneomorphae genera